Seixezelo is a former civil parish in the municipality of Vila Nova de Gaia, Portugal. In 2013, the parish merged into the new parish Pedroso e Seixezelo. The population in 2011 was 1,712, in an area of 1.45 km².

References

Former parishes of Vila Nova de Gaia